Gerard Sutcliffe (born 13 May 1953) is a British Labour Party politician who was Member of Parliament (MP) for Bradford South from 1994 to 2015. He was the Minister for Sport and Tourism in the Brown Government.

Biography 

Born in Salford, Sutcliffe was educated in Bradford at Cardinal Hinsley Grammar School, but left aged sixteen, and then worked as a salesman and for a printers company, becoming a deputy branch secretary of the print workers trade union SOGAT.  He was a member of Bradford City Council from 1982 to 1994, serving as the council's leader from 1992 to 1994.

When Bradford South's Labour MP Bob Cryer was killed in a car crash in April 1994, Sutcliffe was selected as the Labour candidate for the resulting by-election. He won the by-election with 55% of the vote, and held the seat until he stood down in 2015.

In Parliament, he served on the Public Accounts Committee from 1996 to 1998, and was a member of the Unopposed Bills Panel from 1997 to 1999.

After the 1997 general election, when a Labour government took power under Tony Blair, Sutcliffe was appointed as Parliamentary Private Secretary (PPS) to Harriet Harman, the Secretary of State for Social Security.  After Harman was dismissed from the Cabinet in July 1998, he served as PPS to Stephen Byers, the Chief Secretary to the Treasury.  When Byers was promoted to Secretary of State for Trade and Industry in December 1998, Sutcliffe remained his PPS.

From 2003 to 2006 he was Parliamentary Under Secretary of State at the Department of Trade and Industry, with responsibility for employment and for consumer and competition policy.  In the May 2006 reshuffle he was moved to the Home Office, as Minister for Prisons and the Probation Service. As part of the reorganisation of the Home Office he became Parliamentary Under Secretary of State at the newly formed Ministry of Justice in May 2007.  He stayed there only a short time until the reshuffle on 29 June 2007, when he was moved to the Department for Culture, Media and Sport.

As Minister for Sport at the time of the Beijing Olympics he entered a wager with his Australian counterpart Kate Ellis that Great Britain would finish above Australia in the final medal table, with each Minister promising to wear the opposite nation's colours to a sporting event if they lose. Sutcliffe won the bet, with Britain finishing fourth and Australia sixth.

Sutcliffe supported Andy Burnham in the 2010 Labour Party leadership election and acted as Burnham's campaign manager. From 2010 until 2011, Sutcliffe served as Shadow Minister for Immigration. In May 2014, Sutcliffe announced that he would stand down at the following general election. He is a member of Unite the Union.

References

External links 
 Gerry Sutcliffe MP official site
 Guardian Unlimited Politics – Ask Aristotle: Gerry Sutcliffe MP
 TheyWorkForYou.com – Gerry Sutcliffe MP
 
 Stories about Gerry Sutcliffe from The Independent
 

1953 births
Living people
Councillors in Bradford
Graphical, Paper and Media Union-sponsored MPs
Labour Party (UK) MPs for English constituencies
People from Salford
UK MPs 1992–1997
UK MPs 1997–2001
UK MPs 2001–2005
UK MPs 2005–2010
UK MPs 2010–2015
Politicians from Bradford
Rugby league chairmen and investors